Giovanni Bogado (born 16 September 2001) is a Paraguayan football player who plays as midfielder for Club Libertad in Paraguayan Primera División.

References

2001 births
Living people
Paraguayan footballers
Paraguayan Primera División players
Club Libertad footballers
People from Limpio
Association football midfielders